The Cathedral of the Resurrection of Christ  or of Our Saviour, also called the Ivano-Frankivsk Jesuit Church, is an historic religious building in the city of Ivano-Frankivsk in western Ukraine which functions as a Catholic cathedral and seat of the Ivano-Frankivsk Eparchy (Archieparchia Stanislaopolitanus) using the Byzantine or Ukrainian rite (Greek Catholic) in full communion with the Pope in Rome.

The original church on the site was built for the Jesuits between 1720 and 1729, but this structure was demolished as a result of technical errors. The present Baroque church was built between 1752 and 1761 by the ruler of the city, the governor of Poznan and Kiev Stanisław Potocki. Since 1885 it has been a Greek Catholic cathedral. It stands next to an old monastery.

The church has three naves and a west front with two towers. It is under the pastoral responsibility of Archbishop Volodymyr Viytyshyn who was ratified by Pope Benedict XVI in 2005.

See also
Catholicism in Ukraine
Resurrection of Christ

References

Eastern Catholic cathedrals in Ukraine
Buildings and structures in Ivano-Frankivsk
Roman Catholic churches completed in 1761
18th-century Roman Catholic church buildings in Ukraine